Lialehkal-e Bala (also Romanized as Līālehkal-e Bālā; also known as Līālekal) is a village in Tutaki Rural District, in the Central District of Siahkal County, Gilan Province, Iran. At the 2006 census, its population was 18, in 6 families.

References 

Populated places in Siahkal County